H.A. White General Store and House is a historic building located in North Liberty, Iowa, United States.  The central portion of the two-story frame building was completed in 1876.  At least three additions were built onto the original in subsequent years.  It housed the commercial businesses and residence of H.A. White and his family.  It was the only commercial enterprise in North Liberty between 1876 and 1889.  White served as the local postmaster from 1877 through 1888, and the building housed the post office in those years.  Dr. James Polk Von Stein boarded here c. 1879 to 1891 and had his office here as well.  After 1903 the building was used only as a residence, and became a rental property by the 1980s. It was listed on the National Register of Historic Places in 1984.  The building is presently used once again for commercial purposes.

References

Commercial buildings completed in 1876
Houses completed in 1876
Vernacular architecture in Iowa
Buildings and structures in Johnson County, Iowa
National Register of Historic Places in Johnson County, Iowa
Houses on the National Register of Historic Places in Iowa
Commercial buildings on the National Register of Historic Places in Iowa